Spoorthi Jithender (born 25 March 2000) is an Indian playback singer who works primarily in Tollywood, and shot to fame when she sang her first playback song in the Telugu film Yamaho Yama when she was just 11 years old. She became famous with the song "Kukkurukuru" from the movie Kick 2 in S.S Thaman's music direction in the year 2015 . Spoorthi jithender also made her name in the Telugu Book of World Records as the youngest Playback singer, Songwriter, Dubbing artist and Music composer.

Early life and family
Spoorthi Jithender was born to Jithender Yadagiri and Chaitanya Yadagiri and hails from Rama Krishna Puram, Mandamarri, Adilabad District, Telangana. Her father Mr. Jithender Yadagiri himself is a Flim director who directed more than 20 dramas broadcast by All India Radio besides foraying into directing Telugu feature films (Chakri, Veduka, Yamaho yama)

Discography

Independent Folk songs

Female versions and Independent Songs

Devotional and Festival Songs

Awards and nomination
Won Best upcoming female singer gama award (Dubai)
Won Little crazy star of the year 2015 award
Won Andhra kala samitha (Chennai)
Telugu Book of Records Achiever 
 2021- Nominated, SIIMA Award for Best Female Playback Singer for "Undipova" from Savaari

References

Living people
2000 births
Telugu playback singers
Indian child singers
Indian women playback singers
21st-century Indian singers
Singers from Telangana
People from Adilabad district
Women musicians from Telangana
21st-century Indian women singers